Anton Wilhelm Olsen (15 May 1897 – 27 April 1968) was a Norwegian rifle shooter competing in the early 20th century. He won a bronze medal at the 1920 Summer Olympics in Antwerp for team, small bore rifle.

References

1897 births
1968 deaths
Norwegian male sport shooters
ISSF rifle shooters
Olympic bronze medalists for Norway
Olympic shooters of Norway
Shooters at the 1920 Summer Olympics
Olympic medalists in shooting
Medalists at the 1920 Summer Olympics
Sportspeople from Oslo
20th-century Norwegian people